Joffrey Cuffaut (born 15 March 1988) is a French professional footballer who plays for Valenciennes FC as a right-back.

References

External links
 
 
 Profile at SO Foot

1988 births
Living people
Association football defenders
French footballers
Ligue 1 players
Ligue 2 players
Championnat National players
AS Beauvais Oise players
Le Mans FC players
AS Nancy Lorraine players
Valenciennes FC players